Yang Jinshan (born 1954) is a disgraced general in the People's Liberation Army of China. He served as the Deputy Commander of Chengdu Military Region between July 2013 to October 2014, and Commander of Tibet Military District from December 2009 to July 2013. Yang is a former member of 18th Central Committee of the Chinese Communist Party, but was expelled from the body in 2014.

Yang was promoted to the rank of major general (shao jiang) in December 2005 and lieutenant general (zhong jiang) in July 2011. Chinese media reported that Yang had close relations with Xu Caihou, who is the former Vice Chairman of the Central Military Commission and General of the Chinese People's Liberation Army.

Career
Yang was born in Chengguan Town, Xi County, Henan province in August 1954. He graduated from PLA National Defence University. Yang joined the People's Liberation Army in November 1969 and joined the Chinese Communist Party in May 1972.

From August 1995 to January 2001, he served as Director of Combat Department of Chengdu Military Region. Then he served as the Chief of staff of the 14th Group Army. He became the Deputy Chief of Staff of Chengdu MR in November 2005, and served until July 2007, when he was appointed  Director of Armament Department of Chengdu MR. In December 2009, he was promoted to become Commander of Tibet Military District, he remained in that position until July 2013, when he was appointed Deputy Commander of the Chengdu MR.

Sometime in 2014, Yang was investigated by the Discipline Inspection Commission of the Central Military Commission, the military's top anti-graft body. The details of the investigation were not released, as is common practice with military graft cases. Official sources did not state the reasons for his expulsion, though Chinese-language media have speculated about his links to the corruption cases of Gu Junshan and Xu Caihou.

References

1954 births
Living people
Expelled members of the Chinese Communist Party
People's Liberation Army generals from Henan
PLA National Defence University alumni
People from Xinyang
Commanders of the Tibet Military District